John Edward Wilson (June 14, 1929 – December 27, 2011) was a Canadian professional ice hockey player and head coach. He played in the National Hockey League (NHL) with the Detroit Red Wings, Chicago Black Hawks, Toronto Maple Leafs, and New York Rangers between 1950 and 1962. With Detroit Wilson won the Stanley Cup four times. After his playing career he coached in the NHL with the Los Angeles Kings, Detroit, the Colorado Rockies, and Pittsburgh Penguins between 1969 and 1980. He also coached the Michigan Stags/Baltimore Blades and Cleveland Crusaders of the World Hockey Association between 1974 and 1976, as well as the Canadian national team at the 1977 World Championship

Playing career
After three seasons with the Windsor Spitfires, Wilson signed his first professional contract with the Detroit Red Wings of the National Hockey League in September 1949, but spent most of the 1949–50 season with their farm team, the Omaha Knights. He was called up by the Red Wings late in the season and helped them win the Stanley Cup. After spending most of the 1950–51 season in the minors, Wilson joined the Red Wings on a full-time basis midway through the 1951–52 season and went on to help them win three more Stanley Cups (1952, 1954, 1955).

Soon after winning the Stanley Cup in 1955, Red Wings general manager Jack Adams traded Wilson to the Chicago Black Hawks as part of an eight-player swap. After two solid seasons in Chicago, he was reacquired by the Red Wings in the infamous Ted Lindsay trade and played two more seasons with the Red Wings before being traded to the Toronto Maple Leafs in 1959. A year later, the Leafs sent Wilson to the New York Rangers, along with another player, for Eddie Shack.  After two seasons with the Rangers, Wilson retired following the 1961–62 season.

During his NHL career, Wilson scored 161 goals and 171 assists in 688 regular-season games and 27 points in 66 playoff games. He won the Stanley Cup four times with the Red Wings and appeared in two all-star games (1954, 1956). One of his most notable accomplishments was playing in 580 consecutive games between 1951 and 1960, making him the NHL's second "iron man".

Coaching career
In 1967, Wilson was hired as the head coach of the Springfield Kings of the American Hockey League, the minor league affiliate of the new Los Angeles Kings expansion team. Midway into his third season with Springfield, Wilson was promoted to interim head coach of the Los Angeles Kings after Hal Laycoe was fired following a dismal start to the season. However, Wilson was unable to turn the team around and returned to Springfield after the season was finished. He ended up leading Springfield to a Calder Cup title the very next season.

After winning the Calder Cup in 1971, Wilson was hired by the Detroit Red Wings during the 1971–72 season as a midseason replacement. Despite having a winning record behind the Wings' bench, the team missed the playoffs two straight seasons and Wilson was let go. It would be 15 years before another Red Wings' coach would better Wilson's record.

From there, he spent two years in the World Hockey Association, one with the Michigan Stags/Baltimore Blades (1974–75) and one with the Cleveland Crusaders (1975–76). He returned to the NHL, coaching one season with the Colorado Rockies (1976–77), and three with the Pittsburgh Penguins (1977–80), where he led the Penguins to two playoff appearances. Wilson returned to coach Springfield one more season and then retired from coaching in 1981.

Wilson was named coach of the Canadian national team that competed at the 1977 World Championship in Vienna. Canada, making an appearance at the event for the first time since 1969, finished fourth. The team was composed entirely of players whose teams had not qualified for the Stanley Cup playoffs.

Personal
Johnny was the brother of Larry Wilson and uncle of Ron Wilson, both of whom played and coached in the NHL.

Wilson made his home in the Detroit area, together with his wife Pat, and was frequently seen at Red Wings home games. The couple has two children, a son, Kelly and a daughter, Tracy. Tracy A. Wilson, a former TV writer and show host, is currently writing a book - a true story that sent her on a journey into her father's life and led her to discover parts of her own as well. She also writes a blog called Tracy Wilson Writing Life.

On December 27, 2011, Johnny died of pulmonary fibrosis at the age of 82. He had battled lung disease and colon cancer for several years.

Career statistics

Regular season and playoffs

Head coaching record

College

NHL

WHA

References

External links
 

1929 births
2011 deaths
Atlanta Flames
Canada men's national ice hockey team coaches
Canadian ice hockey coaches
Canadian ice hockey left wingers
Chicago Blackhawks players
Colorado Rockies (NHL) coaches
Deaths from pulmonary fibrosis
Detroit Hettche players
Detroit Red Wings coaches
Detroit Red Wings players
Ice hockey people from Ontario
Indianapolis Capitals players
Los Angeles Kings coaches
National Hockey League All-Stars
New York Rangers players
Omaha Knights (USHL) players
People from Bruce County
Pittsburgh Penguins coaches
Princeton Tigers men's ice hockey coaches
Rochester Americans players
Springfield Indians coaches
Stanley Cup champions
Toronto Maple Leafs players
Windsor Spitfires players